Schmugge is a surname. Notable people with the surname include:
Ludwig Schmugge (born 1939), German historian
Thomas Schmugge, American physicist and hydrologist
Thorsten Schmugge (born 1971), German footballer

German-language surnames